Aleksandr Averyanov may refer to:

 Aleksandr Averyanov (footballer, born 1948), Soviet and Russian football player and coach
 Aleksandr Averyanov (footballer, born 1969), Russian football player